Jef Le Penven (3 November 1919 - 30 April 1967) was a French composer, born in Pontivy, Morbihan, Brittany.

Le Penven was the twelfth child of a family of cabinet makers. He was brought up in an atmosphere of traditional vernacular music, learning to play the bombard (Breton oboe) as a child. He studied at the Schola Cantorum in Paris, working with Marcel Dupré.

In 1940, he became the conductor or the Orchestre de Bretagne.

Le Penven's music expresses his attachment to Brittany and Celtic culture. He attempts to integrate traditional and symphonic music. His major works use conventional symphonic and choral forms but typically include bagpipe music.

Le Penven was also well known for his organ improvisations, of which he was a virtuoso.

His setting of the poem Me zo ganet e kreiz ar mor by Yann-Ber Kalloc'h has been interpreted by a number of Breton musicians including Gilles Servat and Alan Stivell.

Compositions

 Tir Na Nog, La Marche des Bretons
 Les Celtes
 Cantate du Bout du Monde
 Symphonie du Morbihan

Notes

1919 births
1967 deaths
People from Pontivy
Breton musicians
French male composers
Schola Cantorum de Paris alumni
20th-century French composers
20th-century French male musicians